The 2012 British Superbike season was the 25th British Superbike Championship season. For the 2012 season, MSVR announced a number of changes to the technical regulations of the spectacle of them British Superbike Championship. The championship will be limited to 32 entries, with 16 teams each entering two bikes. This was designed to be a way of rewarding teams that have had a history of competing in the BSB regularly. Teams who had competed in the 2011 season were given automatic entries, whilst teams who wish to graduate to the BSB class had to buy an entry.

The championship was tightly contested between Shane Byrne, Josh Brookes and Tommy Hill, with the title battle lasting until the final round at Brands Hatch. The first race saw Byrne taking the victory, after Alex Lowes' crash caused the red flag to be thrown. The second race also resulted in a win for Byrne, taking the points standings to 658 for Byrne and 635 for Brookes. The final race thus became a decider, with Byrne only having to finish 13th to win the championship, whilst Brookes needed Byrne to retire, or finish in 15th place to win the title. On the penultimate lap Byrne passed Brookes and became the British Superbikes champion for 2012.

Rule changes
All bikes on the grid had to become part of the Evo class, creating a single-class championship. All bikes had to run a standard ECU (Electronics control unit), and the ECU did not include electronics such as traction control and launch control. 2012 spec bikes were run during the end of the 2011 season, with MSS Colchester Kawasaki's Gary Mason and Team WFR's James Westmoreland running the bikes for 3 and 2 rounds respectively.

Calendar

Notes:
1. – Following a fuel spillage race 2 was cancelled and rescheduled for Oulton Park on 6 May.
2. – Tommy Hill was demoted 5 places on the grid for having the tyre warmers on the bike after the 3 minute warning.

Entry List

Championship standings

Riders' Championship
(key; bold denotes pole position, italics denotes fastest lap)

Manufacturers' standings

References

External links
 The official website of the British Superbike Championship

British
British Superbike Championship
Superbike Championship